Bob "Slim" Dunlap (born August 14, 1951) is an American rock musician. He is a Minnesota-based guitarist and singer-songwriter who is best known as a member of The Replacements from 1987 to 1991, replacing original lead guitarist Bob Stinson. Dunlap also recorded two solo albums in the mid-1990s.

Dunlap was influenced by Hank Williams and Keith Richards, and has been called "one of the last old-school cool guitar players". Ralph Heibutzki at AllMusic said that he "epitomizes the journeyman musician who plays for the fun of it, when his day gig allows".

Biography
Slim Dunlap was born in Plainview, Minnesota, on August 14, 1951. He started playing guitar when he was about ten. In the early 1970s he teamed up with rock musician and visual artist Curtiss A, also known as Curt Almsted, and together they formed Thumbs Up, an "unusual mix of rhythm and blues with pop [that] has been described as early new wave". He also joined Almsted's punk-rock group, Spooks, and featured on all but one of Spooks's albums. Dunlap's work with Almsted established himself as an "intuitive, reliable musician who could fit any situation", and he attracted the attention of Paul Westerberg of The Replacements, a Minnesota-based punk/alternative rock band. Westerberg was looking for a guitarist to replace Bob Stinson, who had been asked to leave in the mid-1980s because of his drug and alcohol problems, and approached Dunlap. Dunlap initially turned down the offer, but joined The Replacements in 1987 on account of "his admiration for Westerberg's songwriting". Dunlap's day job at the time was working as a janitor at First Avenue, a nightclub in Minneapolis, the same venue where The Replacements had launched their career in the early 1980s. Dunlap became the "replacement Replacement", and remained with the band until their breakup in 1991, featuring on their last two studio albums.

In 1991 Dunlap toured with ex-Georgia Satellites lead vocalist Dan Baird to promote Baird's solo album, Love Songs for the Hearing Impaired. Towards the end of 1992 Dunlap started recording his own first solo album, The Old New Me, which was released in 1993. It was followed by his second solo album, Times Like This in 1996. AllMusic called The Old New Me a "rootsy, engaging ride", and Times Like This "the opposite of the Replacements' rowdy, unscripted alt-rock vitriol [that] wins on its own unobtrusive terms". Dunlap performed at The Bottom Line in New York City in December 1997, and he and his own band were active in the Minneapolis area until February 2012 when he was hospitalized after suffering a severe stroke.

Songs for Slim
After Dunlap's stroke, a non-profit project, Songs For Slim, was established to raise money for him by having other artists cover his songs and other merchandise. The releases included an EP by his former bandmates from The Replacements, Songs for Slim, featuring cover art by Chris Mars.

Honors and awards
Dunlap was honored with a star on the outside mural of the Minneapolis nightclub First Avenue, recognizing performers that have played sold-out shows or have otherwise demonstrated a major contribution to the culture at the iconic venue. Receiving a star "might be the most prestigious public honor an artist can receive in Minneapolis," according to journalist Steve Marsh.

Solo discography
Source: AllMusic
The Old New Me (1993, Twin/Tone Records)
Times Like This (1996, Restless Records)

References

American rock guitarists
American male guitarists
The Replacements (band) members
1951 births
Living people
20th-century American guitarists
20th-century American male musicians